Air Devils is a 1938 American action comedy film directed by John Rawlins, based on an original story, "The Fighting Marines" by Harold Buckley. The film stars Larry J. Blake, Dick Purcell and Beryl Wallace.

Plot
Set in the island of Taro Pago in the years before World War II, two former Marine pilots, John P. "Horseshoe" Donovan (Larry J. Blake) and Percy "Slats" Harrington (Dick Purcell), are hired as air "constables" (constabularies) to keep order on the remote Pacific island. Both friends vie for the attentions of Marcia Bradford (Beryl Wallace) and, through a series of misadventures, find that neither will win out.

The two pilots find that local tavern owner, Tom Mordant (Charles Brokaw), has been stirring up the natives and a civil war is brewing. The two rivals have to combine forces to stop violence and bring the island back to peaceful times.

Cast

 Larry J. Blake as John P. "Horseshoe" Donovan
 Dick Purcell as Percy "Slats" Harrington
 Beryl Wallace as Marcia Bradford
 Mamo Clark as Lolano
 Charles Brokaw as Tom Mordant
 Minerva Urecal as Margaret Price
 Forbes Murray as Capt. Hawthorne
 Paul Sutton as Holo
 LeRoy Mason as Robert Walker
 Al Kikume as Don Kahano
 Michael Visaroff
 Billy Wayne as Sgt. Jennings

Production

Air Devils begins with this prologue: "The Pacific Ocean is strewn with tropical islands, large and small, to which drift adventuring souls. The island are policed and protected by constabularies which function under the local governments. These constabularies are well disciplined military organizations, splendidly equipped and officered by men who have completed enlistments in, and been honorably discharged from, the Army, Navy or Marine Corps, but who have succumbed to the magic spell of the South Seas." Despite the presence of Mamo Clark as Lolano, who had made her film debut in a featured role in Mutiny on the Bounty (1935) and the illusion of an exotic locale embodied by lush sets, Air Devils was  a studio property. Universal Pictures began principal photography late March 1938 at Talisman Studios. Air Devils has an aviation-oriented title that is belied by there being very few scenes with an aircraft. Only one Waco biplane is seen in the film.

Reception
Air Devils premiered at 70 minutes, but was subsequently re-edited down to a running time of 57–61 minutes. Typical of many of the low-budget B film of the period, later reviews were not complimentary. "A generic action movie with limited means support. Be it budget or actors. Had a couple of half-decent action scenes, but otherwise a very lackluster storyline which was forgotten as soon as the movie ended." Producer Trem Carr had been behind the numerous John Wayne B films of the same period.

Notes

References

Bibliography

 Wynne, H. Hugh. The Motion Picture Stunt Pilots and Hollywood's Classic Aviation Movies. Missoula, Montana: Pictorial Histories Publishing Co., 1987. .

External links

1938 films
1938 adventure films
American adventure films
American aviation films
American black-and-white films
Films set in Oceania
Universal Pictures films
American action comedy films
1930s action comedy films
1938 comedy films
Films directed by John Rawlins
1930s English-language films
1930s American films